Ergashev is a surname. Notable people with the surname include:

Davron Ergashev (born 1988), Tajik footballer
Ismatilla Ergashev, ambassador of Uzbekistan to Azerbaijan
Jahongir Ergashev (born 1994), Tajik footballer
Mubin Ergashev (born 1973), Tajik professional football coach